Charles Alvin Jones (August 27, 1887 – May 22, 1966) was a United States circuit judge of the United States Court of Appeals for the Third Circuit and chief justice of the Supreme Court of Pennsylvania.

Education and career

Born on August 27, 1887, in Newport, Perry County, Pennsylvania, Jones attended the Newport schools, Mercersburg Academy and Williams College, then received a Bachelor of Laws  from Dickinson School of Law (now Penn State Dickinson Law). He was admitted to the Perry County bar in 1910, before entering private practice in Pittsburgh, Pennsylvania from 1910 to 1939. He served in the American Ambulance Service with the French Army in 1917. He served in United States Naval Aviation as an ensign from 1918 to 1919. In 1938, Jones ran for Governor of Pennsylvania as the endorsed Democratic candidate, but lost to Arthur James by nearly 300,000 votes.

Federal judicial service

Jones was nominated by President Franklin D. Roosevelt on July 14, 1939, to a seat on the United States Court of Appeals for the Third Circuit vacated by Judge John Warren Davis. He was confirmed by the United States Senate on July 18, 1939, and received his commission on July 25, 1939. His service terminated on December 31, 1944, due to his resignation.

Pennsylvania Supreme Court service

Jones was elected to the Supreme Court of Pennsylvania in November 1944 and took his seat on January 3, 1945, as the only Democrat on the court. He served as a Justice until 1966, serving as chief justice from 1956 to 1961; he retired in 1961 due to deteriorating vision.

Notable case

Jones was noted for his authorship of the Court's majority opinion overturning the conviction of Steve Jones, a Communist, on state sedition charges.

Later career and death

Jones was briefly senior advisor to the Philadelphia law firm of Morgan, Lewis & Bockius. Jones died on May 22, 1966, in Wynnewood, Montgomery County, Pennsylvania.

Family

Jones was survived by his wife, Isabella Arrott; they were married in 1918. He was also survived by a son and daughter. Another son, Charles Alvin Jones Jr. was killed during World War II while serving as a Marine aviator in the Pacific.

References

Sources
 
 Morgan, Alfred L. "The Significance of Pennsylvania's 1938 Gubernatorial Election", Pennsylvania Magazine of History and Biography 102, No. 2, April, 1978. Accessed March 27, 2015
 Pittsburgh Press, May 22, 1966, Section 3, pg.3. "Justice Jones Dies at 78".
 "Historical List of Supreme Court Justices" website of the Unified Judicial System of Pennsylvania. Retrieved March 28, 2015.
  Closed for Business: The Story of Bankers Trust Company During the Great Depression", A Digital History Project of the Historical Society of Pennsylvania. Retrieved March 28, 2015.
 "'Good American Couple' Describes Candidate and Wife", Pittsburgh Press, February 27, 1938, pg. 2.
 Squadron Historical Summary, on the website of Marine Bombing Squadron 611. Retrieved March 28, 2015.
 "Charles Alvin Jones", Gettysburg Compiler, October 22, 1938. Retrieved March 28, 2015.

1887 births
1966 deaths
Judges of the United States Court of Appeals for the Third Circuit
United States court of appeals judges appointed by Franklin D. Roosevelt
20th-century American judges
Justices of the Supreme Court of Pennsylvania
Chief Justices of Pennsylvania
United States Navy officers
Pennsylvania Democrats
Dickinson School of Law alumni
People from Newport, Pennsylvania